Andrew Jackson Clements (December 23, 1832 – November 7, 1913) was a surgeon and an American politician as a member of the United States House of Representatives for the 4th congressional district of Tennessee.

Biography
Clements was born in Clementsville, Tennessee, in Clay County, son of Christopher Clements and Polly Fraim and grandson of John Clemans (Revolutionary War Veteran) and Eilzabeth Eagle. He attended a private school and Burritt College at Spencer, Tennessee, studied medicine, and commenced practice in Lafayette, Tennessee.  His first wife, Nancy Jones Clements died in 1858 and he later married Matilda Harlan by whom he had four children: Mollie, Carlos, Carolyn, and Fred.

Career
During the Civil War, Clements was a surgeon with the First Regiment, Tennessee Mounted Volunteer Infantry (Union).

Elected as a Unionist to the Thirty-seventh Congress, Clements served from March 4, 1861, to March 3, 1863.  He was a member of the Tennessee House of Representatives in 1866 and 1867. He resumed the practice of his profession and established a school on his estate for the people of that section of the Cumberland highlands.

Death
Clements died of pneumonia, in Central State Hospital (a mental hospital where he was confined due to senility), Lakeland, Jefferson County, Kentucky, on November 7, 1913 (age 80 years, 319 days). He is interred at Glasgow Municipal Cemetery, Glasgow, Kentucky.

References

External links

1832 births
1913 deaths
People from Clay County, Tennessee
Tennessee Unionists
Unionist Party members of the United States House of Representatives from Tennessee
Union Army surgeons
People of Tennessee in the American Civil War
19th-century American politicians
People from Lafayette, Tennessee
Burritt College alumni